Alaa Hamad Bakir (born 15 January 2001) is a German professional footballer who plays as a midfielder for MSV Duisburg.

Career
After spendings several years at Borussia Dortmund, he moved to MSV Duisburg in the summer of 2021. He made his professional debut in the 3. Liga on 8 August 2021, in the home match against TSV Havelse.

Career statistics

References

External links

2001 births
Living people
Sportspeople from Münster
German footballers
Association football midfielders
Footballers from North Rhine-Westphalia
MSV Duisburg players
3. Liga players
Regionalliga players
Borussia Dortmund II players
German people of Jordanian descent